Tennessee is a 2008 American road drama film directed by Aaron Woodley, produced by Lee Daniels, and starring Ethan Peck, Adam Rothenberg, and Mariah Carey. Vivendi Entertainment has acquired all U.S. rights to the film.

Plot 
In the spring of 1993, a young Carter along with his girlfriend Laurel (Melissa Benoist) find out that Carter's mom (Michele Harris) has been physically abused again by his father (Bill Sage). He decides to leave Tennessee along with his mom and his younger brother Ellis. In 2007, a grown up Carter (Adam Rothenberg) has discovered that his brother Ellis (Ethan Peck) has acute leukemia. Ellis then tells Carter that they might need to go back to Tennessee to have a match for Ellis' bone marrow transplant since Carter is not and their mother is already deceased.

On their way to Tennessee, their car breaks down and they stop at a local diner. There they meet Krystal (Mariah Carey), a waitress who does not seem to enjoy her job. They later get acquainted with her, to which Krystal quits her job and lets the boys ride in to her car to accompany them to Tennessee. Since the boys do not have anywhere to sleep, Krystal brings them to her house where her husband Frank (Lance Reddick), an abusive sheriff, gets mad at the idea of bringing them to his home. In the morning, Krystal realizes that this is not the life she has ever dreamed of since she has always wanted to be a singer-songwriter. She then decides to leave Frank early in the morning and escape with the boys, to be free from Frank’s controlling and abusive tendencies. 

The three head to a bar and dance for a little while until Carter gets drunk and starts inappropriately touching Krystal, angering her. Frank reports Krystal as having been kidnapped and decides to track them using the plate number of her car, to which Krystal trades with another one. Despite that, Frank was still able to catch them on the road. Krystal later outsmarts Frank and they escape to a nearby train station with the three headed to Tennessee.

Arriving at Tennessee, Carter, Ellis and Krystal have run out of pocket money. Krystal then tries to pawn her guitar but Carter stops her after seeing a flyer for a singing contest in a bar, suggesting that she compete. Frank, who arrived late at Tennessee, sees a girl traumatically abused by her boyfriend. He sees his own relationship with Krystal reflected in theirs and has an epiphany. He heads to a bar, where the singing contest is happening and sees Krystal performing to which he does not pursue her but instead sets her free. After winning, Krystal gives them just enough money to get to Tennessee and they part ways.

While on the bus, Carter finds out that Ellis has passed out where he then rushes him to a hospital. Ellis later wakes up and asks Carter for a picture of a mountain in a nearby middle school to which Carter later finds out that his ex-girlfriend Laurel is there working as a teacher. Afraid to talk to her, he decides to head back to the hospital. Carter drives and heads to his old house to which he discovers that their father is not there. An old woman in the neighborhood asks Carter if he is the son of Roy and tells him that a package is waiting for him. He finds out that his father passed away 5 years prior and that the package was made by Ellis which contains a letter saying that Ellis knew about their father's death all along and decided to throw a trip to Tennessee in order for Carter to realize this and face his fears that he has always thought of ever since he left home. He also said that the picture was for him to find out that Laurel was still there and to take this chance to talk to her again.

Ellis eventually succumbs to his Leukemia, but not before Krystal pays him one last visit on his death bed. Carter and Krystal scatter his ashes on the top of the mountain. Krystal decides to return home and Carter tells her that he will be waiting for her big break as a singer. Carter then travels to the middle school and finds Laurel. The film fades to black before the audience finds out if he approached Laurel to talk to her again.

Cast
 Ethan Peck as Ellis Armstrong
 Adam Rothenberg as Carter Armstrong
 Ryan Lynn as young Carter  
 Mariah Carey as Krystal
 Lance Reddick as Frank
 Michele Harris as Karen Armstrong 
 Bill Sage as Roy Armstrong 
 Melissa Benoist as Laurel
 Christopher Andrews as Jackson 
 Mary Evans as Jackson’s Mother 
 David House as Eugene 
 Alex Manette as Dr. McCullough
 Debrianna Mansini as Nurse Meyers
 Nasser Metcalfe as Dr. Maxwell
 Robyn Reede as Darlene 
 Boots Southerland as Pawn Shop Owner

Music
Mariah Carey co-wrote "Right to Dream" with Willie Nelson and performed it with Nelson's harmonica player, Mickey Raphael, for the movie's soundtrack. "It's not really country," says Nelson, "It's more Mariah."

In May 2010, Carey's cover of Kris Kristofferson's "Help Me Make It Through the Night," was leaked online.  It was originally supposed to appear on the Tennessee soundtrack.

Release

The premiere of Tennessee took place at the Tribeca Film Festival on April 26, 2008. Tennessee was released to 15 theaters on June 5, 2009. Playing in limited release, Tennessee has grossed $9,438 from 15 theaters for a per-screen average of $629 in its opening weekend. As of June 24, it grossed a total of $16,100.

Home media
The DVD, initially scheduled for release on September 1, 2009, was released on January 26, 2010 in accordance with the film's official promotional site. A Blu-ray version of the film has yet to be released in the US, instead getting released in Canada. The disc is presented in the original theatrical aspect ratio in HD but with only lossy audio, no subtitles, and no special features.

Critical reception
Critical response for the film was generally mixed, with Metacritic calculating an average rating of 42% based on 8 reviews. Based on 21 reviews collected by Rotten Tomatoes, Tennessee had an average rating of 33% with an average score of 4.5/10. Its consensus says "Despite some beautiful scenery, Tennessee can't extend its simple premise beyond typical independent road trip movie tropes." The Hollywood Reporter said that the pacing is off and that the movie meanders until it reaches its unexpectedly powerful conclusion.

References

External links
 
 
 
 

2008 films
2008 drama films
American drama films
Films shot in New Mexico
Films directed by Aaron Woodley
2000s English-language films
2000s American films